Minden is a ghost town in Calhoun County, Alabama, United States. It possessed a post office during 1878 and 1879.

References

Geography of Calhoun County, Alabama
Ghost towns in Alabama
Towns in Alabama